Matt Fulks is an American sports journalist, author, broadcaster and feature writer. He has written for Kansas City's Metro Sports, and his work has appeared in various newspapers and publications including The Kansas City Star and USA Todays Sports Weekly.

Professional life 
Fulks started his journalism career while attending Lipscomb University in Nashville, Tennessee, as a play-by-play broadcaster on radio, a producer for WSMV-TV, sports director for WAKM radio and a sports writer with the Review-Appeal.

After leaving the newspaper business, Fulks began working as a freelance writer and author. He has written nearly 20 sports books with various sports figures including Marcus Allen, Frank White, Tom Flores, and broadcasters Max Falkenstien, Fred White and Denny Matthews. He's also written two books for CBS Sports, Stories from the Final Four and Super Bowl Sunday: The Day America Stops. He's hosted a syndicated sports talk show, Behind the Stats. Fulks is currently the director of The Major Leagues Foundation.

Works 
 "Behind the Stats: Tennessee's Coaching Legends"
 "The Sportscaster's Dozen"
 "Play by Play," with Denny Matthews and Fred White
 "CBS Sports Presents: Stories from the Final Four"
 "Super Bowl Sunday: The Day America Stops"
 "Tales from the Oakland Raiders," with Tom Flores
 "The Road to Canton," with Marcus Allen
 "Good As Gold," with Frank White
 "Tales from the Royals Dugout," with Denny Matthews
 "Echoes of Kansas Basketball"
 "More Than The Score"
 "A Good Place to Stop," with Max Falkenstien and Doug Vance
 "The Good, The Bad & The Ugly: Pittsburgh Steelers"
 "Hi, Anybody!" with Denny Matthews
 "For Jayhawks Fans Only"

Personal life 
Fulks, a native of Overland Park, Kansas, lives in the Kansas City area with his wife and three kids.

References

External links
Matt Fulks' website
Behind the Stats website
Amazon.com's author page

American radio sports announcers
American radio writers
American sportswriters
American television producers
Lipscomb University alumni
People from Overland Park, Kansas
Year of birth missing (living people)
Living people